Flint is an unincorporated community in Sharon Township, Franklin County, Ohio, United States, located north of downtown Columbus near the intersection of Flint and Park Roads. It was served by stations on the Cleveland, Columbus and Cincinnati Railroad (New York Central system) and Sandusky and Columbus Short Line Railway (Pennsylvania system), which opened through the area in 1851 and 1893, respectively.  President Abraham Lincoln’s Funeral Train passed thru Flint-Worthington,  en route to the Statehouse, on April 29, 1865.

Notable residents

 Dick Reynolds, member of the Texas House of Representatives

References

Unincorporated communities in Franklin County, Ohio
Unincorporated communities in Ohio